The Rozvi Empire (1684–1866) was a Shona state established on the Zimbabwean Plateau by Changamire Dombo. The term "Rozvi" refers to their legacy as a warrior nation, taken from the Shona term kurozva, "to plunder". They became the most powerful fighting force in the whole of Zimbabwe.

History
In 1683, Portuguese militia tried to take control of the gold trade in the interior of Africa by invading the Rozvi empire. However, the Rozvi, armed with their traditional spears and shields, repelled these attacks and maintained control of the gold mines, until their empire collapsed. The Rozvi were led by Changamire Dombo, and his son Kambgun Dombo whose power was based in Butua in the southwest of Africa. The Rozvi were formed from several Shona states that dominated the plateau of present-day Zimbabwe. They drove the Portuguese off the central plateau, and the Europeans retained only a nominal presence at one of the fair-towns in the eastern highlands.

Changamire brought the whole of old
-day Zimbabwe under his control, forming a polity that became known as the Rozvi Empire. This powerful kingdom of warriors was to be known as the Rozvi or baLozwi people. They established their capital at Danangombe, also known as Dhlo-Dhlo (in the Northern Ndebele language)        
 
The administrative power of the Mutapa began to fail in its control of the whole empire, and tributaries began to exert more independence.

A leader of the people of Guruuswa, given the title Changamire and known as Dombo, became independent from the Mutapa. When the Portuguese tried to colonize them, Changamire Dombo led rebellions against their rule. The area of the Rozvi Empire fluctuated. Its influence extended over much of present-day Zimbabwe, westward into Botswana, and southward into northeastern South Africa. The Rozvi leader Changamire Dombo was originally a herdsmen in the Mutapa state, yet managed to drive away the Portuguese, earning himself support and followers, thereby enabling him to break away from the legendary Mutapa empire. Changamire Dombo, according to oral tradition, is believed to have possessed supernatural powers. He was said to be able to turn a white cow into a red one, and more. His magical ability made him feared by people and earned him respect and even more followers. The name Changamire became the honour name of all the kings who followed after him.

The Rozvi's political system was hierarchical. Kingship followed a male line and the king was the highest political, religious, military, economic, judicial and social authority, as well as the main distributor of land. The King was helped to rule by an advisory council made of state officials appointed by him; this consisted of his most senior wives, the crown prince, the tumbare (regent), religious leaders, military commanders and vassal chiefs. The Rozvi Empire eventually became the most powerful empire in present-day Zimbabwe.

Many tales identify Dombo ('Rock') as Chikura Wadyembeu. Modern scholars agree that this is confusion with another leader of a different people. Rulers of Rozvi State included Chirisa Mhuru and Chikuyo Chisamarenga.

Invasions and demise 
In the late 1700s and early 1800s, the Rozvi Empire faced a number of challenges. Like the Mwenemutapa Empire, it was federal in nature, and political tensions between allied kingdoms and the ruling dynasty resulted in some kingdoms (e.g. Manyika) and chieftainships breaking away from the Empire. Internal palace revolutions and constant attacks from the BaMangwato placed increased political pressure on the empire. Two major droughts, 1795 to 1800 and 1824 to 1829, contributed to political instability. Long-standing trading partners like the Portuguese shifted their attention to slaves, thus decreasing demand for gold; thus the Shona tradition of gold mining and trade, which had lasted almost a millennium, declined and so the power of central governments like the Rozvi started to weaken. On top of all the challenges, the 1830s  were a time of multiple invasions and wars that the Rozvi Empire never recovered completely from.

In the area of modern-day South Africa, a number of events resulted in a mass exodus. Drought, invading Dutch settlers and the catastrophic aftermath of the Mfecane resulted in waves of Nguni tribes moving north. Successive attacks on the Empire by the Mpanga, Ngwana, Maseko and Zwangendaba were repelled, but did much damage. Another wave of attacks followed from the group led by the Swazi Queen Nyamazanana, resulting in the capture of the capital Manyanga and the murder of the Rozvi Mambo Chirisamhuru. Contrary to the established narrative, this was not the end of the Rozvi Empire. Chirisamhuru's son, Tohwechipi escaped and went into exile in the Buhera area. With the support of the Mutinhima and other Noble Rozvi Houses, Tohwechipi effectively became the Rozvi Mambo.

Mzilikazi realized that although some of the Rozvi nobility had accepted him as King, most of the Shona did not accept him, limiting the geographic area of his Kingdom. Taking a diplomatic approach, he sent word to Tohwechipi asking him to return home and submit to him, crowning him King of the Shona. Tohwechipi did not accept Mzilikazi's offer and instead, consolidated his power and spent the next 30 years in a series of back-and-forth raids and counter-raids with Mzilikazi and eventually Lobengula, earning the nickname Chibhamubhamu because of his army of raiders armed with rifles. Tohwechipi was defeated in battle, and surrendered in 1866 and curiously, Mzilikazi let him go. He died around 1873 in Nyashanu area in Buhera and was buried there in Mavangwe Hills. Tohwechipi's grave is a protected national monument.

Technology and economy
The economic power of the Rozvi empire was based on cattle herding, farming, and gold mining. Crops included sorghum and millet, and the state depended heavily on subsistence farming. Livestock was important; they kept sheep, goats, cattle and chickens; men who owned much livestock had high social status. Mining was a major branch and was done by men. Internal and external trade were important, especially with Arab traders, exchanging ivory, copper and gold for guns, salt, beads and sea shells.

Rozvi kings revived the tradition of stone building and constructed impressive cities, now known as 'zimbabwes', throughout the southwest. Polychrome pottery was also emblematic. Warriors were armed with spears, shields, bows and arrows. Portuguese records show that the Rozvi were sophisticated military strategists. They were noted for using the cow-horn formation years before the great Zulu leader Shaka adopted it in the 19th century. Armed with spears, shields, bows and arrows, the aggressive Rozvi took over the Zimbabwe plateau.

List of rulers
Names and dates taken from John Stewart's African States and Rulers (1989).
 Changamire I (c. 1480–1494)
 Changamire II (1494–1530)
 Changamire Tumbare (1530–c. 1660)
 Changamire Dombo (c. 1660–1695)
 Changamire Zharare (c. 1695–c. 1700)
 Changamire Negamo (c.1700–1710)
 Chirisamuru (c. 1712–1788)
 Changamire Dhafa(c. 1790–1824)
 Changamire Baswi (c. 1825)
 Changamire Chirisamuru II (c. 1828–1831)
 Changamire Tohwechipi Zharare (1831–1866)

See also
Dhlo-Dhlo, an archelogical site

References

History of Zimbabwe
Former monarchies of Africa
Former empires in Africa
17th century in Africa
18th century in Africa
19th century in Africa
States and territories established in 1660
States and territories disestablished in 1866
1660 establishments in Africa
1866 disestablishments in Africa